The N'Mai River or N'Mai Hka is a river in northern Myanmar (Burma).

Course
The N'Mai, runs parallel to the Mali River, and has its source in the Himalayan glaciers of eastern Tibet at about 28° north latitude. It is not navigable because of strong currents. The N'mai River ends at its confluence (Myit-son) with the Mali River in Kachin State where the two rivers form the start of the Ayeyarwady River. 

The confluence is "one of the most significant cultural heritage sites for the Kachin people and an important landmark for all of Burma." Construction of the Myitsone Dam has begun at this confluence.

History
The British forester and ornithologist, Bertram E. Smythies studied the area in the 1940s. More recently, Kalaya Lu, Assistant Lecturer in the Department of Botany at Myitkyina University between 2002 and 2006, published a paper on plant diversity in the river watershed, concluding it consists of many different ecosystems, changing in elevation from 800 metres to more than 4,600 metres, and containing among the richest areas of Sino-Himalaya flora diversity in the world. 

In 2007, the government of Myanmar signed an agreement with China Power Investment Corporation to construct a series of dams on the Ayeyarwady, Mali, and N’Mai rivers. For the N'Mai, one on the Mali, and one at the confluence, up to five dams were proposed. This dam, the largest of the seven, would destroy the confluence. Construction started in 2008 and a local protest about one of the dams at Chibwe met with government suppression.

See also
 Eastern Himalayan alpine shrub and meadows
 Northern Triangle temperate forests

References

External links
 Earth Snapshot, Satellite image
 Area Map (China)

Rivers of Myanmar